The 1993–94 season of the Liga Portuguesa de Futsal was the 4th season of top-tier futsal in Portugal. The season started on September 22, 1993, and ended on June 4, 1994. Sporting CP won the competition for the third time in total and the second time in a row, making it the first time a team won back-to-back futsal national championships in Portugal. Santo Tirso withdrew halfway through the season, as such the games the team had played for the league didn't count towards the final standings and every team had a bye in the second half of the season.

Teams

League table

See also
Futsal in Portugal

References

Futsal
Portuguese Futsal First Division seasons
Portugal